Judge Pepper may refer to:

Pamela Pepper (born 1964), judge of the United States District Court for the Eastern District of Wisconsin
W. Allen Pepper Jr. (1941–2012), judge of the United States District Court for the Northern District of Mississippi

See also
Judge Pepper, a character in Judge Dredd media